Gaggiano ( or Gasgian ) is a comune (municipality) in the Province of Milan in the Italian region Lombardy, located about  southwest of Milan.

Gaggiano borders the following municipalities: Cusago, Cisliano, Albairate, Trezzano sul Naviglio, Vermezzo, Zibido San Giacomo, Gudo Visconti, Noviglio, Rosate.

Gaggiano is served by Gaggiano railway station.

Here, in 1849 Pope Francis' great-grandfather was born.

Demographic evolution

International relations

Twin towns — Sister cities
Gaggiano is twinned with:

 Albertirsa in Hungary (since 1992)

References
Notes

External links
 www.comune.gaggiano.mi.it

Cities and towns in Lombardy